Dichromia sagitta is a moth of the family Erebidae first described by Johan Christian Fabricius in 1775. It is found in India, Macau, Hong Kong, Japan and Taiwan.

Biology
The larvae had been recorded on Marsdenia species, Marsdenia volublis (Apocynaceae), Tylophora asthamatica, Tylophora ovata and Tylophora indica, an Asclepiadaceae.

References

Hypeninae
Moths of Asia